Pierre-Paulin Andrieu (7 December 1849 – 15 February 1935) was a French  Cardinal of the Roman Catholic Church and archbishop of Bordeaux et Bazes.

He was educated at the Seminary of Toulouse in Toulouse, France. He was ordained to the priesthood on 30 May 1874. He worked as a priest doing pastoral work from 1874 for a year. He was chosen by Julien-Florian-Félix Desprez, the Archbishop of Toulouse, to be his secretary until 1880.

Episcopate

Pope Leo XIII appointed Andrieu Bishop of Marseille on 18 April 1901. He was consecrated on 25 July 1901 in the Cathedral of Toulouse.

Cardinalate

Bishop Andrieu was created and proclaimed Cardinal-Priest of S. Onofrio in the consistory of 16 December 1907 by Pope Pius X. He was appointed to the metropolitan see of Bordeaux on 2 January 1909. He took part in the conclaves of 1914 which elected Pope Benedict XV, and of 1922, which elected Pope Pius XI. As Archbishop he issued the first condemnation of a member of the French hierarchy against L'Action Française in 1926.

He died on 15 February 1935 in Bordeaux, aged 85.

References

Sources

1849 births
1935 deaths

20th-century French cardinals
Archbishops of Bordeaux
Bishops of Marseille
Place of birth missing
Cardinals created by Pope Pius X